"You Suck" is a song by American alternative pop duo the Murmurs, released as the second single from their second studio album, Murmurs (1994). The song is about a New Yorker who ripped off band members Leisha Hailey and Heather Grody sometime during the 1990s. Composed by the Murmurs, the track is an acoustic punk song with lyrics about betrayal written by Hailey.

"You Suck" was released in 1994 via MCA Records and charted at number 89 on the US Billboard Hot 100. It also found success in Australia and Norway; in the latter country, it reached number one for a week in mid-1995. A more explicit version of the song featuring the phrase "you fuck" appears on the Australian single release.

Background
According to Murmurs members Leisha Hailey and Heather Grody, the song found its inspiration some time after the duo left New York's American Academy of Dramatic Arts. The two women met a New York man who ripped them off both financially and mentally, and Hailey decided to write a song about this experience. Speaking to Billboard magazine about the track, the Murmurs clarified that the song is not a track about hating men, explaining, "It's about overcoming and making it through, getting through the roughness of a situation and going on." However, following the song's exposure from radio airplay, Hailey and Grody witnessed other women dedicating the song to their husbands or other people that had upset them. The two did not mind the song's feminist interpretation, saying that it helped bring attention to their music.

Release and reception
MCA Records released "You Suck" in the United States in 1994. The song debuted and peaked at number 89 on the Billboard Hot 100 chart that December, staying at the position for two weeks. The song also appeared on the Billboard Modern Rock Tracks chart, reaching number 23 the same month. In February 1995, the song charted in Australia, peaking at number 25 the following month and staying in the ARIA Singles Chart top 50 for 10 weeks. Listeners of Australian radio station Triple J ranked the song at 52 on the Hottest 100 of 1995 poll.

In Europe, Music & Media magazine referred to the song as a "snake in the grass" and called it "peculiar but cool" in May 1995. Later that month, on Norway's 21st chart week of 1995, "You Suck" debuted at number 19 on the country's VG-lista ranking. Two weeks later, the song entered the top 10, eventually reaching the top three on chart week 26, where it lingered for four more weeks. On chart week 31, the song rose to number one, where it stayed for that week only. It spent a total of 21 weeks in the Norwegian top 20 and was certified platinum by IFPI Norway.

Track listings

US cassette single
 "You Suck"
 "Mission"

Australian CD single
 "You Suck"
 "You Suck" (F*** version)
 "Mission"

European CD single
 "You Suck" – 3:15
 "Mission" – 2:55
 "Game Player" – 2:49
 The Murmurs were credited as "The Murmurs America" in Europe

Credits and personnel
Credits are taken from the singles' liner notes.

Studio
 Recorded at Sear Sound and Looking Glass Studios (New York City)

Personnel

 The Murmurs – music
 Leisha Hailey – lyrics
 Heather Grody
 Roger Greenawalt – production, recording

 Billy Basinski – production
 Ben Wish – recording
 Arthur Spivak – management

Charts

Certifications

|}

References

1994 singles
1994 songs
MCA Records singles
Number-one singles in Norway
Songs with feminist themes